Co-op Academy Failsworth, formerly Failsworth School, is a co-educational secondary school admitting children between 11 and 16 years of age. The school is located in Failsworth, Greater Manchester.

School history

New school buildings were opened in 2008 at a cost of £28 million.

In 2010 the school was found to be in deficit of £582,000.

In 2014 the school was judged Inadequate. In 2016 the judgement improved to Requires Improvement.

The school became an academy as part of the Co-operative Academies Trust in 2017. As of 2019 the school had not yet been inspected again since it became an academy.

Academic performance

In 2018 the school's Progress 8 benchmark was "well below average". 28% of pupils achieved grade 5 or above in English and math GCSEs, compared to 36% in the local authority area and 40% nationally. The school did not meet the government's minimum standards at GCSE ("floor target").

Notable former pupils
 Nathan Eccleston – Footballer, formerly of Liverpool and Blackpool.
 James Mudriczki – Singer, Puressence.
 Tony Szuminski – Musician, Puressence.
 James Tarkowski – England capped footballer currently playing for Premier League side Everton.
 Darren Wharton – Musician who is a member of Thin Lizzy and Dare.
 Ronnie Wallwork, Former professional footballer who won the Premier League with Manchester United. Wallwork also played for West Bromwich Albion and Sheffield Wednesday

References

Secondary schools in the Metropolitan Borough of Oldham
Academies in the Metropolitan Borough of Oldham
Failsworth